Play in the Super 10s stage of the 2014 ICC World Twenty20 took place from 21 March to 1 April 2014. The top eight Full Member nations in the ICC T20I Championship rankings as of 8 October 2012 automatically progressed to the Super 10 stage of 2014 ICC World Twenty20.

Group 1

Matches

Group 2

Matches

See also
 2014 ICC World Twenty20 Group Stage

References

External links
 Official 2014 ICC World Twenty20 site

Super 10s